The Channel Tunnel Safety Authority is an international regulatory body responsible for safety in the Channel Tunnel.

The CTSA was established by the Treaty of Canterbury. It advises the Intergovernmental Commission on safety matters, and ensures that safety rules in the Channel Tunnel are in line with prevailing safety laws.

The CTSA has five members from France, and five from the UK; leadership alternates annually.

After safety rule changes which would permit Eurostar to use German-made Siemens Velaro rolling stock, the French government dismissed their delegate to the CTSA, and brought in a replacement.

See also
 European Railway Agency
 1996 Channel Tunnel fire
 2008 Channel Tunnel fire

References

External links
 The Channel Tunnel intergovernmental commission
 Development of the Channel Tunnel safety case

Safety Authority
Railway safety
Transport safety organizations